Christine Dumitriu Van Saanen (1932 – April 2008) was a Romanian-born Canadian writer, educator, engineer and geologist.

Biography
The daughter of a Dutch diplomat in Romania, she was born in Bucharest and was educated there and at the Oil & Gas Institute. She came to Canada in 1977. She taught at the École Polytechnique de Montréal and then the Université du Québec à Montréal. From 1982 to 1987, she taught at the University of Calgary. In 1982, she founded the Société littéraire francophone de l'Alberta and served as its president until 1987. She then moved to Ottawa, where she was head of a company specializing in artificial intelligence. She moved to Toronto in 1990, where she taught French to members of the public service. In 1992, she founded the Salon du livre de Toronto and served as its director general until 2006. The annual prize awarded by the Salon du livre was named the Prix Christine-Dumitriu-van-Saanen in 1999. Van Saanen also taught at Glendon College at York University.

She published both scientific articles and poetry. Poetry collections included L'Univers est, donc je suis (1998), Mémoires de la Terre (1999), Les Heures sable (2001), La Saga cosmique (2003) and Hommage aux origines de la vie (2006).

Van Saanen died in Toronto at the age of 76 from complications related to cancer.

References 

1932 births
2008 deaths
Canadian poets in French
20th-century Canadian engineers
20th-century Canadian geologists
Canadian women poets
Engineers from Bucharest
Romanian writers in French
Academic staff of the Université du Québec à Montréal
Academic staff of the University of Calgary
20th-century Canadian poets
20th-century Canadian women writers
21st-century Canadian poets
21st-century Canadian women writers
Romanian emigrants to Canada
Romanian people of Dutch descent
20th-century Romanian engineers
Academic staff of Glendon College